"The Eyes of Truth" is a song by German New age band Enigma, released as the second single from their second album, The Cross of Changes (1993), in April 1994. Similar with "Age of Loneliness", it features samples of Mongolian Folk Music (most notably Alsyn Gazryn Zereglee (Алсын газрын зэрэглээ)) and samples taken from Anne Dudley's album Songs from the Victorious City. It also contains samples from U2's song "Ultraviolet (Light My Way)", Peter Gabriel's "Kiss That Frog", NASA retransmissions sampled from "Mare Tranquillitatis" performed by Vangelis, and Genesis' "Dreaming While You Sleep". The accompanying music video for the song was recorded in the rural areas of Nepal.

Track listing
 Radio edit – 4:36
 Album version – 7:27
 The Götterdämmerung Mix (The Twilight of the Gods)– 7:17
 Dub version – 5:34

Charts

Release history

References

1993 songs
1994 singles
Enigma (German band) songs
Music videos directed by Julien Temple
Song recordings produced by Michael Cretu
Songs written by Michael Cretu
Virgin Records singles